A Frankenstein veto occurs when an American state Governor selectively deletes words from a bill, stitching together the remainder (à la Victor Frankenstein) to form a new bill different from that passed by the legislature. 

In 2008, the state Constitution of Wisconsin was amended to place certain restrictions on the Frankenstein veto. With those changes, the governor of Wisconsin still has far greater veto powers than any other governor in the United States of America.

Overview 
The practice requires that a Governor have (or has successfully claimed) the power to veto individual words in a bill passed by the legislature rather than the bill in toto. It became particularly prominent in Wisconsin, where it was used by Governors of both parties "to create spending or to redirect tax funds in ways never approved by the Legislature" by "string[ing] together pieces of separate sentences to create a single new sentence...." For instance, Governor Jim Doyle used selective deletion to transform "a 272-word section of the Legislature's budget into a 20-word sentence that took $427 million from the transportation budget and gave it to public schools." The same technique was used the following year to raise the levy limits on local governments from 2% to 3.86%.

The Wisconsin State Journal, in response, stated that "no Governor should be allowed to veto all but a couple dozen words and figures across reams of text in state budgets to unilaterally create law from scratch." The New York Times called the practice "a legislative twist on the game of Mad Libs."

Example 
WISN-TV provided a satirical example of how the Frankenstein veto works. Start with Governor Doyle's press release on the retirement of Brett Favre:

The Frankenstein veto allows that statement to be transformed into this one: "Governor Jim Doyle will be suiting up in the green and gold next season as quarterback of the Packers." The trick is in selective deletion:

With this tool, and sufficient audacity, "Governors could basically 'veto' into law just about anything they wanted."

Curtailing 
Wisconsin had previously eliminated an even more extreme version—dubbed the "Vanna White veto"—in 1990 "when they prohibited state leaders from deleting individual alphabetic letters and numerical characters in a bill to change the intent of the legislation" in response to its controversial use by then-Governor Tommy Thompson. 

An amendment to the Wisconsin Constitution passed in 2008 sought to curb the practice even further, but its prohibition on "crossing out words and numbers to create a new sentence from two or more sentences" left intact the Governor's power to "cross out words within a sentence to change its meaning, remove individual digits to create new numbers or delete entire sentences from paragraphs." This loophole has allowed the practice to continue, albeit less frequently.

See also
Governor of Wisconsin
Line item veto

References

Governor of Wisconsin
Wisconsin law
Veto